The 1931 Guildford by-election was a parliamentary by-election held for the British House of Commons constituency of Guildford in Surrey on 25 August 1931.

The seat had become vacant on the death of the Conservative Member of Parliament (MP) Sir Henry Buckingham, who had held the seat since the 1922 general election.

The Liberal candidate who had finished a strong second at the 1929 general election, Somerset Stopford Brooke, withdrew his candidature, allowing the Conservatives an uncontested return the day after Ramsay MacDonald formed his National Government.

The Conservative candidate, Charles Rhys, had previously been MP for Romford from 1923 general election to 1929 general election, and held the Guildford seat until he stood down at the 1935 general election

See also 
 Guildford (UK Parliament constituency)
 The town of Guildford
 List of United Kingdom by-elections (1918–1931)

References 
 

1931 elections in the United Kingdom
1931 in England
By-elections to the Parliament of the United Kingdom in Surrey constituencies
20th century in Surrey
Unopposed by-elections to the Parliament of the United Kingdom (need citation)
Politics of Guildford
August 1931 events